Picallo is a Spanish surname from Galicia. It is common in Spain, Latin America, and the Philippines.  It is a very popular surname in Argentina.

People with the surname include:
Paula Vázquez Picallo (born 1974), Spanish television presenter
Ramon Suarez Picallo, politician in Buenos Aires, Argentina
Faustino Picallo, Argentine politician
Isabel Blanco Picallo, Spanish actress

Lists of people by surname
Spanish-language surnames